Shahkot, is a town and one of three tehsils in the Nankana Sahib District of Punjab, Pakistan. It has a hill park which is being converted to a theme park. it’s about 151 mi (or 243 km) south of Islamabad, the country's capital. Until 2005, it was part of Sheikhupura District.
City name is on the name of famous 12th century Sufi Darbar Baba Nu Lakh Hazari

See also
 Kirana Hills
Darbar Baba Nu Lakh Hazari

References

Populated places in Nankana Sahib District
Tehsils of Punjab, Pakistan